On May 27, 2017, eight people were fatally shot in a spree killing that took place in Lincoln County, Mississippi. The perpetrator, Willie Cory Godbolt, sustained an injury to his arm in a shootout with victim Ferral Burage and Godbolt was subsequently arrested.

Shootings
The shootings began at around 11:30 p.m. at a house in Bogue Chitto. Three women and 36-year-old police officer William Durr were shot dead at that house. Two boys were found shot to death at a house in Brookhaven and an adult male and female were found shot to death at another house. The perpetrator, 35-year-old Cory Godbolt, was shot and wounded by police and taken to hospital for treatment. At the same time, being arrested, Godbolt told a reporter that he had intended to commit suicide by cop and deserved to die for his actions. Godbolt's wife and their children were unharmed in the incident.

The victims were Deputy William Durr, Barbara Mitchell, Brenda May, Toccara May, Austin Edwards, Jordan Blackwell, Ferral Burrage, and Sheila Burrage.

Perpetrator 

The perpetrator of the shootings, Willie Cory Godbolt (born May 1, 1982), then 35, has an extensive criminal record dating back to 2005, including arrests for armed robbery, aggravated assault, simple assault, driving with a suspended license, and disorderly conduct. He was most recently arrested in 2016 for assault.

Godbolt stated to reporter Therese Apel from The Clarion-Ledger who interviewed him during his arrest, that he had gone to the Bogue Chitto house to talk with his estranged wife, her mother, and stepfather about taking his children back home and that one of them called the police, ultimately leading to the shooting. Apel's video also documents him appearing to tell authorities where to find Sheila Burrage's body and saying that he would tell police where all the victims were if they would get a deputy off his back. Godbolt's trial started on February 15, 2020. On February 25, 2020, he was convicted of multiple counts of capital murder for the shootings. Two days later, Godbolt was sentenced to death. Godbolt is currently confined at Mississippi State Penitentiary in Sunflower County.

See also 

2023 Arkabutla shootings

References

External links 

 Cory Godbolt articles from The Daily Leader
 See the uncut footage from the arrest of alleged spree killer Cory Godbolt from The Clarion-Ledger
 Fallen deputy's legacy remains one of joy, love from The Clarion-Ledger
 Teen died a hero saving cousin during shooting spree from The Clarion-Ledger

2017 in Mississippi
2017 mass shootings in the United States
Mass shootings in the United States
Deaths by firearm in Mississippi
Attacks in the United States in 2017
Lincoln County, Mississippi
May 2017 crimes in the United States
Spree shootings in the United States
Mass shootings in Mississippi
Massacres in the United States